Dresden-Kemnitz station is a railway station in the Kemnitz district in the capital city of Dresden, Saxony, Germany.

References

External links

Kemnitz